Deyang railway station is a second-class railway station in Deyang. It was built in 1952. It is on the Xi'an–Chengdu high-speed railway and Baoji–Chengdu railway.

History
Work to rebuild the station began in November 2009. The station reopened on 22 March 2011.

References 

Railway stations in Sichuan